Jesus Gloria Molina (born May 31, 1948) is an American politician and a former member of the Los Angeles County Board of Supervisors and the Los Angeles County Metropolitan Transportation Authority.

Molina broke into politics in 1982 by going against the powerful male-dominated Eastside political machine for a seat on the California State Assembly. She was the first Latina elected to the California Assembly. She had a long unbeaten streak in electoral politics. In 1987, she was the first Latina elected to the Los Angeles City Council and to the Los Angeles County Board of Supervisors in 1991. She was on the board for 23 years.

Early life and activism
Molina grew up as one of ten children in the Los Angeles suburb of Pico Rivera to a Mexican-American father, Leonardo Castillo Molina, and a Mexican mother, Concepción Molina. She attended public schools in her hometown, and attended Rio Hondo College, East Los Angeles College, and California State University, Los Angeles. While attending college, she worked full-time as a legal secretary. Then she became certified as an adult education instructor and taught clerical skills at the East Los Angeles Skills Center.

Molina's early career was characterized by her involvement in the Chicano movement and advocating for women's health. An early accomplishment of Molina's was when she started a Nurse Mentoring Program in an effort to address the country's shortage of nurses by partnering with local community colleges to encourage and help more students to pursue a nursing degree.

Political career 

She was first elected to office in 1982 as state assemblywoman for the 56th District. In 1987, she was elected to the Los Angeles City Council where she served as the Councilwoman of the First District until 1991. In February 1991, she was elected to the Los Angeles County Board of Supervisors, representing the First Supervisorial District. Molina is the first Latina in history to be elected to the California State Legislature, the Los Angeles City Council, the Los Angeles County board of supervisors, and to serve as an assemblywoman at the California State Assembly. During her 23 years serving the Los Angeles County board of supervisors, she became known as a fiscal watchdog committed to overseeing good government reforms, maintenance of the county's public health care system, and also quality-of-life issues for the millions of county residents living in the unincorporated areas.

Prior to being elected to public office, Molina served in the Carter White House as a deputy for presidential personnel. After leaving the White House, she served in San Francisco as a deputy director for the Department of Health and Human Services.

One of Molina's significant achievements was her involvement with the Mothers of East Los Angeles, a group formed to organize against a proposed plan to build a prison in East LA.  As city councilwoman, she found government unresponsive to her concerns of yet another proposal to build a prison near schools in the predominantly Chicano and Mexican neighborhood.  In the mid-2000s she drove through skid row looking for families with children and would call the Department of Family and Children Services, to help families and remove children from unsafe conditions.

In April 2006, Molina was honored as the "Hispanic Business Woman of the Year" by Hispanic Business magazine. In 2008, Molina piloted a program that became known as the Gloria Molina Foster Youth Education Program. This program attempted to improve the high school graduation rates of students in the foster care system. By committing social worker's to aid in helping manage and track these student's academic success the program was able to raise the graduation rate from the national average of 58% to 80%. When Molina retired from her supervisor position in 2014 because of term limits, she stated that one of her biggest regrets was that she was not able to do more to improve the high school graduation rates amongst fostered youth.

In 2014, Molina was awarded the honorary Doctor of Humane Letters (L.H.D.) from Whittier College.

Legislation

Anti-food truck bill 
In April 2008, Molina introduced legislation to the board of supervisors which would severely increase penalties on food vendors in unincorporated areas of Los Angeles County, including East L.A. The new rules would punish parking of a food truck for more than 1 hour with a $1000 fine and/or six months in jail.  This move is specifically targeted at vendors operating taco trucks, a cultural institution in East L.A. as well as the county as a whole.  Newspaper editorials decried the move, and a petition was quickly set up to attempt to force a repeal of the legislation. The taco vendors have also hired a lawyer to fight their cause.

Boycott of Arizona 
In June 2010, Molina voted yes with two other Los Angeles County supervisors to boycott Arizona because of SB 1070. Molina claims in her statement that "This law simply goes too far," said Gloria Molina, the boycott's primary sponsor. "A lot of people have pointed out that I am sworn as an L.A. County supervisor to uphold the Constitution. All I can say is that I believe that Arizona's law is unconstitutional."

Personal life 
Molina is married to Ron Martinez,, with the two having a daughter, Valentina Martinez. In March 2023, Molina announced that she was diagnosed with terminal cancer three years prior, and that she had been battling it with treatments but it had become very aggressive.

See also
National Association of Latino Elected and Appointed Officials
 Torristas and Molinistas

References

External links 

Oral history interview with Molina
Join California Gloria Molina

|-

|-

|-

|-

|-

|-

Los Angeles County Board of Supervisors
1948 births
Living people
Los Angeles City Council members
Democratic Party members of the California State Assembly
Women state legislators in California
Hispanic and Latino American women in politics
People from Pico Rivera, California
East Los Angeles College alumni
California State University, Los Angeles alumni
Women city councillors in California
Mexican-American people in California politics
Hispanic and Latino American city council members
21st-century American women